The Șoimul or Șoimu is a left tributary of the river Iara in Romania. It flows into the Iara near Cerc, Romania.

References

Rivers of Romania
Rivers of Cluj County